Scoundrel Club is the third of four Japan-exclusive EPs by A-ha. Like the other three EPs, it is quite rare due to being only released in Japan. It reached #29 on the Japanese albums chart.also there was released Scoundrel Club Picture which it reached #27. Tracks 1–4 were included on the 2010 deluxe edition of the album Scoundrel Days (track 3 as a download-only bonus track). Track 5 was included on the 2010 deluxe edition of the album Hunting High and Low and the 2015 expanded edition of the album Hunting High and Low.

Track listing
 "Cry Wolf" (extended version) – 8:14
 "We're Looking for the Whales" (live version) – 3:50
 "I've Been Losing You" (dub) – 4:29
 "Manhattan Skyline" (extended remix) – 6:49
 "Hunting High and Low" (extended remix) – 6:01

References

 	   

A-ha albums
1987 EPs
1987 remix albums
Warner Records remix albums
Warner Records EPs
Remix EPs